Daniel Luke Zelman (born June 16, 1967) is an American actor, screenwriter, television producer, and director.

Early life and education
Zelman was born in New York. He earned a Bachelor of Fine Arts from Harvard University in 1990 and a Master of Fine Arts from New York University Tisch School of the Arts in 1993. He is Jewish.

Career
Zelman is an executive producer on the FX drama series Damages, which he co-created with Todd A. Kessler and Glenn Kessler. Todd Kessler, Glenn Kessler, and Zelman were nominated for an Emmy Award for Outstanding Writing for a Drama Series for their work on the pilot episode of Damages, titled "Get Me A Lawyer". He also wrote They Nest, Anacondas: The Hunt for the Blood Orchid, and Fool's Gold.

Personal life
In 1990, Zelman met Debra Messing at New York University. Zelman and Messing married on September 3, 2000, and have a son, Roman Walker Zelman, who was born on April 7, 2004. On December 20, 2011, it was announced that Zelman and Messing were ending their eleven-year marriage. Messing filed for divorce on June 5, 2012. The divorce was officially completed on March 1, 2016.

Filmography

Film

Television

References

External links

1967 births
Living people
Jewish American screenwriters
American male screenwriters
American male television actors
Place of birth missing (living people)
American television directors
Damages (TV series)
Tisch School of the Arts alumni
Showrunners
American male television writers
Harvard College alumni